Rabeh Saqer is a Saudi Arabian singer.

References

External links
  (Arabic)
 
 

21st-century Saudi Arabian male singers
Living people
Year of birth missing (living people)
20th-century Saudi Arabian male singers